Greenwillow is a musical with a book by Lesser Samuels and Frank Loesser and music and lyrics by Loesser. The musical is set in the magical town of Greenwillow. It ran on Broadway in 1960.

Overview
Based on the novel by B. J. Chute, the musical is a fantasy, set in the magical town of Greenwillow. In Greenwillow, the eldest in each generation of Briggs men must obey the "call to wander", while the women they leave behind care for the home and rear their children in the hope that some day their husbands will return. Gideon loves his girlfriend, Dorrie, and would like nothing better than to settle down with her, and finds in the town's newest inhabitant, the Reverend Birdsong, an ally who will try to help him make his dream come true.

Production
The musical had a pre-Broadway try-out at the Shubert Theatre in Philadelphia. The musical opened on Broadway on March 8, 1960, at the Alvin Theatre, and closed on May 28, 1960, after 97 performances. The director was George Roy Hill and choreographer was Joe Layton, scenery by Peter Larkin and costumes by Alvin Colt.  The cast included Anthony Perkins as Gideon Briggs, Cecil Kellaway, Pert Kelton, Ellen McCown as Dorrie Whitbred, William Chapman, Marian Mercer and Tommy Norden.

The show was hampered by mixed reviews. The New York Times described the production as “an enchanted fable” in a very positive review: “an ideal libretto”....”warm and varied score that captures the simple moods of the story”....”the makers of ‘Greenwillow have never faltered”....”winning cast”...joyous ballets”....”these are some of the elements of a musical play that brings distinction to the stage and pleasure to the people out front.”

Reviewer Ward Morehouse wrote, “Frank Loesser retains his standing as a composer but he is lost as a librettist….the book that he has written in collaboration with Lesser Samuels is hopelessly stodgy.” Morehouse, however, thought Perkins “ingratiating” and a capable singer, and McCown “an attractive heroine,” and had compliments for Larkin’s sets and Layton’s “imaginative dance routines. But ‘Greenwillow’ is a lost cause.”

The Philadelphia Inquirer handily excerpted opening-week reviews from several New York papers: “The new musical is do-it-yourself folklore, which means that it is spun right out of someone’s head instead of out of somebody else’s past…In the theater…Greenwillow is nowhere—not in Brigadoon, not in Glocca Morra, not in the valley just below Old Smoky. Being neither Irish nor Dutch, Scotch nor good Broadway, it is forced to invent a language of its own that is a mélange of all four but with the special delights, rhythms and authenticities of none (Walter Kerr, NY Herald Tribune).” “[It] has moments of fresh charm, but it also turns out to be upsettingly flat, stodgy and lacking in emotional effectiveness...scenes and characters that possessed touching or humorous charm in the novel become excessively whimsical and uncomfortably coy, when not simply dull, on the stage (Richard Watts, Jr., New York Post).” “[It] brings heart and hope to a season that has not been distinguished by either...It is not, perhaps, what the trade regards as a ‘sockoo success,’ like ‘Guys and Dolls,’ but it is musically more ambitious, and is loaded with the sort of homespun pathos and humor which should keep it running until the scenery quietly comes apart (John McClain, New York Journal-American).” 

This musical was being rehearsed in New York while Anthony Perkins was simultaneously filming the Alfred Hitchcock classic shocker Psycho (1960) in Los Angeles.  He had a stand-in for the shower scene in that film. Stephen Rebello in his book "Alfred and the Making of Psycho" documented that because the filming of the movie's now-iconic shower scene did not "require the services of Anthony Perkins", Hitchcock allowed him to attend play rehearsals in New York.

The musical was presented by the York Theatre Company (New York City) in its "Musicals-in-Mufti" series in 2004. Peter Filichia described the score as "grand" and mentioned Brooks Atkinson's glowing 1960 appraisal of Loesser's music.

Song list
Source: Internet Broadway database; AllMusic 

Act I
 "A Day Borrowed from Heaven"
 "The Music of Home"
 "Gideon Briggs, I Love You"
 "The Autumn Courting"
 "The Call to Wander"
 "Summertime Love"
 "Walking Away Whistling"
 "The Sermon"
 "Could've Been a Ring"
 "Gideon Briggs, I Love You (Reprise)
 "Halloweve"
 "Never Will I Marry"
 "Greenwillow Christmas"

Act II
 "The Music of Home (Reprise)"
 "Faraway Boy"
 "Clang Dang the Bell"
 "What a Blessing"
 "He Died Good"
 "The Spring Courting"
 "Summertime Love (Reprise)"
 "What a Blessing (Reprise)"
 "The Call"
 "The Music of Home (Reprise)"

Awards and nominations
The musical received 1960 Tony Award nominations:" 'Greenwillow' Awards" ibdb.com, accessed November 21, 2016

Best Actor in a Musical (Perkins)
Best Featured Actress in a Musical (Pert Kelton)
Best Scenic Design (Musical) (Peter Larkin)
Best Costume Design (Alvin Colt)
Best Choreography (Joe Layton)
Best Conductor and Musical Director (Abba Bogin)
Best Stage Technician (James Orr)

Cecil Kellaway won the Outer Critics Circle Award for Outstanding Actor in a Musical.

Recordings
Bing Crosby recorded "The Music of Home" on January 28, 1960, and it was issued on a 45rpm disc by RCA Victor.

Barbra Streisand recorded "Never Will I Marry" for The Third Album in 1964, and sang it live in her early club act.

Nancy Wilson recorded "Never Will I Marry" on Nancy Wilson and Cannonball Adderley'' (1962).

Judy Garland performed "Never Will I Marry" frequently in the 1960s, including for her aborted 1962 album "Judy Takes Broadway" and on "The Judy Garland Show".

Caterina Valente performed both "Summertime Love" and "Never Will I Marry" in 1963 for her album "Valente In Swingtime" (on CD in, for instance, 2005).

Linda Ronstadt recorded "Never Will I Marry" on her twenty-fourth and final solo studio album Hummin' to Myself in 2004.

References

External links
 Internet Broadway database
 Greenwillow at the Music Theatre International website
 Time magazine review

1960 musicals
Broadway musicals
Musicals based on novels
Musicals by Frank Loesser
Works by Lesser Samuels